Iese Mukhranbatoni (died 1716) was a Georgian nobleman of the House of Mukhrani, a collateral branch of the royal Bagrationi dynasty of Kartli. He was Prince (batoni) of Mukhrani and ex officio commander of the Banner of Shida Kartli and Grand Master of the Household (msakhurt-ukhutsesi) at the court of Kartli c. 1700.

Iese was a son of Ashotan II, Prince of Mukhrani, and succeeded his cousin Constantine II, Prince of Mukhrani.

Ashotan had a son, Ashotan (died 1750)

References 

1716 deaths
House of Mukhrani
Year of birth unknown
17th-century people from Georgia (country)
18th-century people from Georgia (country)